Martin Staszko (born 22 June 1976 in Třinec) is a Czech poker player, best known as the runner-up of the Main Event at the 2011 World Series of Poker, where he finished second to Pius Heinz.

Life and career
Staszko lives in the city of Třinec. His parents are Rudolf, who works in Třinec Iron and Steel Works, and Žofie, who works as a pharmacist.

As a child, Staszko was an athlete, becoming long jump champion of his Třinec Polish primary school. He started playing mariáš and betting on sport games during high school. Later, while studying at Technical University of Ostrava, he not only supported himself from the games, but he also saved roughly CZK400,000 (€14,000) annually. During his studies, Staszko became champion of the Czech university darts league and was also a successful chess player. After finishing studies, Staszko started working at Třinec Iron and Steel Works.

He began playing poker in 2007, initially playing online in games which did not require entrance fee, but provided some very limited returns. At that time, Staszko worked as foreman at Hyundai Nošovice automobile manufacturing plant's paint shop. He was in charge of around 200 workers, earning a little over CZK 30,000 (€1,200) a month. He used to get up at five in the morning in order to attend twelve hours shifts followed by playing poker, leaving only some four to five hours for sleep. He was able to win an equivalent of six-months salary during a night online session. In 2010, following a win of €35,000 in France, Staszko decided to leave his job in order to fully concentrate on gaming.

His runner-up finish in the 2011 Main Event garnered him $5.43 million (€3.98 million).

References

1976 births
Sportspeople from Třinec
Czech chess players
Czech poker players
Living people